The Pascack Valley Line is a commuter rail line operated by the Hoboken Division of New Jersey Transit, in the U.S. states of New Jersey and New York. The line runs north from Hoboken Terminal, through Hudson and Bergen counties in New Jersey, and into Rockland County, New York, terminating at Spring Valley. Service within New York is operated under contract with Metro-North Railroad. The line is named for the Pascack Valley region that it passes through in northern Bergen County. The line parallels the Pascack Brook for some distance. The line is colored purple on system maps, and its symbol is a pine tree.

Description

The Pascack Valley Line runs between Spring Valley, New York, and Hoboken Terminal. The entire line is owned by NJ Transit, but the Pearl River, Nanuet and Spring Valley stations are leased to Metro-North Railroad. The line is single tracked, but sidings at points along the line, including the Meadowlands, Hackensack and Nanuet, permit bi-directional off-peak service. A siding in Oradell was also planned for increased service and reliability, but the project was halted due to local opposition. Service on this line operates seven days a week.

History

The line was originally chartered as the Hackensack and New York Railroad in 1856. It later became the New Jersey and New York Railroad, which was bought by the Erie Railroad in 1896. The New Jersey and New York Railroad continued to exist as an Erie subsidiary until October 17, 1960 merger that created the Erie Lackawanna Railroad.

On April 1, 1976 the Erie Lackawanna was merged with several other railroads to create Conrail. In 1983, after several years under operation by Conrail, operations of the Pascack Valley Line were transferred to NJ Transit Rail Operations.

The line used to continue north of Spring Valley to Haverstraw, New York. This portion of the line has been abandoned and most of the right-of-way has been sold off. Part of the line (between Spring Valley and Nanuet) was once part of the main Erie Railroad line from Piermont, New York to Buffalo, New York. Into the 1930s there had been Erie passenger service from Spring Valley at the end of the Pascack line to Suffern station on the newer Erie Main Line. By 1941, this was reduced to a single weekday trip in each direction.

In August 2020, amidst the financial repercussions of the COVID-19 pandemic, the Metropolitan Transportation Authority said that it would shut down service on the line in Rockland County if federal bailout money were not available.

September 2016 crash

On September 29, 2016, Pascack Valley Line Train 1614 crashed into Hoboken Terminal injuring 108 and killing one.

Rolling stock
All service on this line is diesel, using either GP40PH-2, F40PH, PL42AC, or ALP-45DP locomotives. Most trains on the line use Comet series passenger cars, although Bombardier MultiLevel coaches are sometimes used on this line.

Some train sets use equipment owned by Metro-North, which are so marked.

Stations

Bibliography

References

External links
Pascack Valley Line History
Some additional history

Erie Railroad lines
Metro-North Railroad
NJ Transit Rail Operations
Pascack Valley
Rail infrastructure in New Jersey
Rail infrastructure in New York (state)
Transportation in Bergen County, New Jersey
Transportation in Rockland County, New York
Rail lines in Rockland County, New York